James Robert Weir (1882–1943) was an American mycologist specializing in wood decaying fungi and forest pathology. He advised Henry Ford on rubber plantations and was head of The U.S. National Fungus Collections.

References

American mycologists
1882 births
1943 deaths
Purdue University alumni
Ludwig Maximilian University of Munich alumni